The Blayney Advocate and Carcoar Herald was an English language newspaper published in Blayney, New South Wales, Australia.

History 
The Blayney Advocate and Carcoar Herald was first published on 1 January 1898 by John Mellor. It was published weekly on Saturday mornings with yearly subscriptions costing sixteen shillings. The newspaper ceased publication on 31 December 1904.

Digitisation 
The Blayney Advertiser and Carcoar Herald has been digitised as part of the Australian Newspapers Digitisation Program of the National Library of Australia.

See also 
 List of newspapers in New South Wales
 List of newspapers in Australia

References

External links 
 

Defunct newspapers published in New South Wales
Publications established in 1898
Newspapers on Trove